"Conceited (There's Something About Remy)", simply known as "Conceited", is the second single from American rapper Remy Ma's debut solo studio album There's Something About Remy: Based on a True Story. Produced by Scott Storch, the song contains a sample of "I'm Too Sexy" by Right Said Fred.

The song was also featured in the 2011 documentary, Black Lifestyle in Japan, where she was praised for having a "stylish" look and recognized as one of the most frequently listened to hip-hop musicians in Japan.

Background
"Conceited" was written by Scott Storch and Remy Ma, credited as Scott Storch and Remeinise Mackie respectively. The song contains samples of "I'm Too Sexy" by Right Said Fred and "Dip It Low" by Christina Milian. The writers of these two songs, Fred Fairbass, Richard Fairbrass, Rob Manzoli, Poli Paul, Teedra Moses, and John Jackson, receive songwriting credits for "Conceited" as a result.

Chart performance
Conceited peaked at #71 on Billboard Radio Songs chart, #17 on Billboard Hot Rap Songs chart, #24 on Billboard R&B/Hip-Hop Airplay charts, #7 on Billboard Hot R&B/Hip-Hop Songs Recurrents chart and #4 on Billboard Bubbling Under R&B/Hip-Hop Songs chart.

Music video
The music video premiered on January 7, 2006 on VH1 and was directed by Scott Franklin. The video opens with Smith laying on her mattress in her penthouse, being fanned and assisted by shirtless men and women. Later, she walks upstairs into her closet getting dressed for an event. Fellow Terror Squad member Fat Joe makes a cameo in the video.

Track listings and formats
12-inch single
 "Conceited (There's Something About Remy)" (Clean) — 3:41  
 "Conceited (There's Something About Remy)" (Instrumental) — 3:41  
 "Conceited (There's Something About Remy)" (Dirty) — 3:41  
 "Conceited (There's Something About Remy)" (Acappella) — 3:24

US 12" vinyl
 "Conceited (There's Something About Remy)" (Clean) — 3:41  
 "Conceited (There's Something About Remy)" (Instrumental) — 3:41  
 "Conceited (There's Something About Remy)" (Dirty) — 3:41  
 "Conceited (There's Something About Remy)" (Acappella) — 3:24

12-inch promo single
 "Conceited (There's Something About Remy)" (Clean) — 3:41  
 "Conceited (There's Something About Remy)" (Instrumental) — 3:41  
 "Conceited (There's Something About Remy)" (Dirty) — 3:41  
 "Conceited (There's Something About Remy)" (Acappella) — 3:24

CD single
 "Conceited (There's Something About Remy)" (Clean) — 3:41  
 "Conceited (There's Something About Remy)" (Dirty) — 3:41  
 "Conceited (There's Something About Remy)" (Instrumental) — 3:41

Charts

Weekly charts

Year-end charts

References

External links
 

2005 songs
2005 singles
Remy Ma songs
Number-one singles in the United States
Song recordings produced by Scott Storch
Songs with feminist themes
Songs written by Scott Storch
Songs written by Remy Ma
SRC Records singles